Pierre Lamo  (died 1578) was an Italian painter mainly of histories. He was a pupil of Innocenzo da Imola. He died in Bologna.

References

16th-century Italian painters
Italian male painters
Painters from Bologna
1578 deaths
Year of birth unknown